Interstate 94 (I-94) is a part of the Interstate Highway System that runs from Billings, Montana, to the Lower Peninsula of the US state of Michigan. In Michigan, it is a state trunkline highway that enters the state south of New Buffalo and runs eastward through several metropolitan areas in the southern section of the state. The highway serves Benton Harbor–St. Joseph near Lake Michigan before turning inland toward Kalamazoo and Battle Creek on the west side of the peninsula. Heading farther east, I-94 passes through rural areas in the middle of the southern Lower Peninsula, crossing I-69 in the process. I-94 then runs through Jackson, Ann Arbor, and portions of Metro Detroit, connecting Michigan's largest city to its main airport. Past the east side of Detroit, the Interstate angles northeasterly through farmlands in The Thumb to Port Huron, where the designation terminates on the Blue Water Bridge at the Canadian border.

The first segment of what later became I-94 within the state, the Willow Run Expressway, was built near Ypsilanti and Belleville in 1941, with an easterly extension to Detroit in 1945. This expressway was initially numbered M-112. In the mid-1950s, state and federal officials planned an Interstate to replace the original route of US Highway 12 (US 12). By 1960, the length of I-94 was completed from Detroit to New Buffalo. Two years later, the US 12 designation was dropped from the freeway. Subsequent extensions in the 1960s completed most of the rest of the route, including the remaining sections between Detroit and Port Huron which superseded the routing of US 25. The last segment opened to the public in 1972 when Indiana completed its connection across the state line. Since completion, I-94 has remained relatively unchanged; a few interchanges have been rebuilt, a second span was constructed for the Blue Water Bridge, and, in 1987, a plane crashed on the freeway during takeoff from the airport in Detroit. The routing of I-94 is notable for containing the first full freeway-to-freeway interchange in the United States, connecting to the Lodge Freeway (M-10), and for comprising the first complete border-to-border toll-free freeway in a state in the United States. The highway has one auxiliary route, I-194, which serves downtown Battle Creek, and eight business routes. Various segments have been dedicated to multiple people and places.

Route description
The entire length of I-94 is listed on the National Highway System, a network of roadways important to the country's economy, defense, and mobility. The freeway carried 168,200 vehicles on average between I-75 and Chene Street in Detroit, which is the peak traffic count in 2015, and it carried 12,554 vehicles immediately west of the Blue Water Bridge in Port Huron, the lowest traffic count in 2015. As the state trunkline highway closest to the lake shore in these areas, I-94 carries the Lake Michigan Circle Tour south of Benton Harbor–St. Joseph and the Lake Huron Circle Tour in the Port Huron area. Sections through the Detroit area are named the Detroit Industrial and Edsel Ford freeways. I-94 in the state is either a four- or six-lane freeway for most of its length; one segment in the Detroit area has up to 10 lanes total near the airport.

Southwestern Michigan
I-94 enters Michigan from Indiana south of New Buffalo. I-94 traverses an area just east of the Warren Dunes State Park as the freeway runs parallel to the Red Arrow Highway, a former routing of US 12 named after the 32nd Infantry Division (Red Arrow Division). The freeway crosses its companion highway south of St. Joseph; Red Arrow turns northward carrying the business loop for Benton Harbor and St. Joseph (Business Loop I-94, [BL I-94]). The Interstate curves further inland to bridge the St. Joseph River near Riverview Park. East of Benton Harbor, I-94 meets the other end of BL I-94 at an interchange where US 31 merges onto the freeway. East of the Southwest Michigan Regional Airport, I-94/US 31 meets the southern end of I-196; US 31 departs the I-94 freeway to follow I-196, and I-94 continues its course away from Lake Michigan.

South of Coloma, the trunkline turns eastward and roughly follows the Paw Paw River on a course that takes it south of Watervliet and Hartford. Between the latter two cities, the freeway transitions from northeastern Berrien County into western Van Buren County. It curves around and between Lake Cora and Threemile Lake near the junction with the northern end of M-51. About  further east, I-94 crosses M-40 south of Paw Paw. Continuing eastward, the Interstate runs through Mattawan before entering western Kalamazoo County.

In Texas Township, the freeway enters the western edges of the Kalamazoo suburbs. South of the campus for Western Michigan University's College of Engineering & Applied Sciences in Portage, I-94 intersects US 131. Near the Kalamazoo/Battle Creek International Airport, the Interstate passes into the southeastern corner of Kalamazoo before entering Comstock Township. The freeway intersects the eastern end of Business Spur I-94 (BS I-94) at a partial interchange near Morrow Lake in the township. I-94 continues out of the eastern Kalamazoo suburbs, paralleling the Kalamazoo River through the Galesburg area. Before crossing into Calhoun County on the west side of Battle Creek, I-94 has the only driveway on any of Michigan's Interstate Highways for a gate providing access for military vehicles into the Fort Custer Training Center.

The Interstate enters Calhoun County southwest of the W. K. Kellogg Airport and enters the city of Battle Creek. Immediately east of the county line, the freeway has an interchange with the western end of Battle Creek's business loop. Next to Lakeview Square Mall, I-94 meets its only auxiliary Interstate in Michigan: I-194. I-94 turns to the northwest to round Beadle Lake, intersecting M-294 before spanning the Kalamazoo River. East of the river crossing, the freeway meets an interchange for M-96, M-311, and the eastern end of the Battle Creek business loop near FireKeepers Casino Hotel in Emmett Township. Turning back eastward, the Interstate exits the eastern Battle Creek suburbs and continues to an interchange with I-69 near Marshall; the business loop for Marshall follows I-69 southward.

Into Metro Detroit
Continuing eastward, I-94 traverses rural land on the north side of Marshall. The freeway runs north of, and parallel to, the Kalamazoo River through eastern Calhoun County. It angles southeasterly toward Albion before returning to an easterly course on the north side of town. I-94 crosses into western Jackson County before intersecting M-99. From there, it runs generally due east with a jog around Parma. West of the county airport, the Jackson business loop follows M-60 southward, and I-94 travels through the north side of Jackson. North of downtown, US 127 merges in from the north and runs concurrently with I-94 around the city. Southeast of Michigan State Prison, US 127 departs to the south, and I-94 continues eastward through the rest of the county.

The freeway runs north of the Chrysler Chelsea Proving Grounds in Chelsea next to the M-52 interchange. As I-94 continues easterly, it passes into the western edge of the Ann Arbor area. West of downtown, the M-14 freeway splits off to the northeast, and the Interstate turns to the south and southeast to curve around the south side of the city. The freeway passes between Briarwood Mall and Ann Arbor Municipal Airport. On the southeastern corner of Ann Arbor, I-94 intersects US 23 and continues around the south side of Ypsilanti. South of that city, the freeway also carries US 12 and crosses the Huron River north of the river's mouth at Ford Lake. I-94 jogs southeasterly around the south side of Willow Run Airport complex, separating from US 12 and entering Wayne County.

South of Willow Run, the Interstate parallels the north shore of Belleville Lake. East of the water body, it intersects I-275 near the northwest corner of Detroit Metropolitan Airport and angles northeasterly through the southwestern Detroit suburbs along the Detroit Industrial Freeway. I-94 uses the Gateway Bridge over the single-point urban interchange (SPUI) at US 24 (Telegraph Road) in Taylor; these bridges were inspired by Super Bowl XL and provide a western entrance to the city. Further east, the Interstate intersects M-39 (Southfield Freeway) and passes the Uniroyal Giant Tire in Allen Park. I-94 then turns to the northeast through the Ford River Rouge complex in Dearborn before turning back easterly on the Edsel Ford Freeway into Detroit.

I-94 traverses Detroit in an east–west direction well inland of, and parallel to, the Detroit River. The freeway intersects I-96 (Jeffries Freeway) and M-10 (Lodge Freeway) on the West Side, passing the main campus of Wayne State University before entering the East Side at M-1 (Woodward Avenue). Immediately east of the interchange with I-75 (Chrysler Freeway), I-94 forms the southern border of the Milwaukee Junction district. The Edsel Ford Freeway continues through residential neighborhoods of Detroit's East Side. The Interstate turns more northerly, mimicking the shoreline of Lake St. Clair, and exits Detroit for Harper Woods. Just north of the interchange for M-102 (Vernier Road), the freeway crosses 8 Mile Road and enters Macomb County.

North to Canada
The freeway continues to parallel the lakeshore and travels to the west of Selfridge Air National Guard Base in Harrison Township. It turns back to the northeast at 23 Mile Road at the interchange with M-3 and M-29. North of 26 Mile Road, the freeway exits the northern suburbs and passes into farmland in The Thumb region.

South of Michigan Meadows Golf Course, I-94 crosses County Line Road and enters St. Clair County. The freeway continues northeasterly as far as Marysville before turning northward near St. Clair County International Airport. From there, it runs roughly parallel to the St. Clair River. The Interstate travels along the western edge of residential areas for Marysville and Port Huron as it continues northward. Immediately west of downtown Port Huron, it intersects I-69; the two freeways merge and turn first east and then north through an interchange that also features connections to BL I-69.

On the eastern bank of the river, there is one final interchange for M-25 and BL I-69/BL I-94 before the freeway reaches the toll and customs plazas for the twin-span Blue Water Bridge. Past these plazas, I-94/I-69 ascends the approach to the bridge which crosses the St. Clair River to Point Edward (Sarnia), Ontario. At the international boundary at the center of the river, the Interstate designations jointly terminate, becoming Ontario Highway 402.

History

Predecessor highways

The first major overland transportation corridors in the future state of Michigan were the Indian foot trails. One of these, the St. Joseph Trail, followed the general route of the modern I-94 across the state from the Benton Harbor–St. Joseph area east to the Ann Arbor area. The State Trunkline Highway System was created on May 13, 1913, by an act of the Michigan Legislature; at the time, Division 6 corresponded to the rough path of today's I-94. In 1919, the Michigan State Highway Department (MSHD) signposted the highway system for the first time, and three different highways followed sections of the modern I-94 corridor. The original M-11 ran from the Indiana state line north to Coloma where M-17 connected easterly to Detroit. The third highway was M-19 from Detroit northeast to Port Huron.

On November 11, 1926, the United States Numbered Highway System was approved by the American Association of State Highway Officials (AASHO), and the original route of US 12 replaced the highways from the state line northeasterly to Detroit; US 31 overlapped the highway between St. Joseph and Watervliet. The remainder of the future I-94 corridor was served by US 25 between Detroit and Port Huron. The first span of the Blue Water Bridge opened between Port Huron and Point Edward, Ontario, in 1938.

Early conversions to freeways

The first segments of upgraded highways along the future route of I-94 were added during World War II. Construction on the Willow Run Expressway started in 1941 before the US entered the war. It was opened on September 12, 1942, to provide improved access to Ford Motor Company's Willow Run bomber plants. The highway was given the M-112 designation at the time. The expressway was extended eastward as the Detroit Industrial Expressway into Detroit; the first section opened in 1943 and the remainder was completed in March 1945. Land acquisition for the Edsel Ford Freeway started in 1945. Originally referred to as the Crosstown Freeway, the freeway became known as the Edsel Ford Freeway following an April 1946 petition. The interchange between the Lodge Freeway and the Edsel Ford Freeway was built in 1953 as the first full freeway-to-freeway interchange in the US. In mid-1956, the M-112 designation was decommissioned and replaced by a rerouted US 12. During the mid-1950s, the Detroit Streets and Rails campaign proposed a high-speed rail line in the median of the Willow Run, Detroit Industrial and Edsel Ford freeways; instead of building the rail line, special boarding stations adjacent to dedicated bus lanes in the interchanges along the highway were used.

In other parts of the state, other segments of highway were built to bypass the cities along the future I-94 corridor. In 1940, a southern bypass of Battle Creek opened along Columbia Avenue, and the former routing through downtown on Michigan Avenue became Business US 12 (Bus. US 12). In late 1951 or early 1952, a northerly bypass of Jackson opened, and the former route through downtown on Michigan Avenue became another Bus. US 12. By the next year, the western half of the Jackson bypass opened, including a bypass of Parma. In 1954, a new bypass of Kalamazoo and Galesburg opened; US 12 was rerouted to follow the new highway while M-96 replaced part of the old route and US 12A in the area.

The first planning maps from 1947 for what later became the Interstate Highway System included a highway along I-94's route in Michigan. This highway was included on the 1955 plan for the "National System of Interstate and Defense Highways" with a proposed spur in the Battle Creek area. The modern I-94 was numbered I-92 between Benton Harbor–St. Joseph and Detroit with I-77 from Detroit to Port Huron in the August 1957 plans.

In April 1958, the MSHD wanted to provide a single number for a more direct routing of a Detroit–Chicago freeway; the state proposed rerouting I-94 to replace I-92 in the state, but retained the I-77 designation. On June 27, 1958, AASHO adopted their original numbering plan for Michigan, minus the state's proposed changes. Around the same time, a section of M-146 near Port Huron was converted into an approach freeway for the Blue Water Bridge.

Interstate Highway era
In January 1959, officials announced that sections of US 12, the Willow Run, Detroit Industrial and Edsel Ford expressways were to be given the I-94 designation, temporarily co-designated with US 12. These sections connected Ann Arbor to Detroit, along with a bypass of Kalamazoo to Galesburg and a bypass of Jackson. Later that year, additional segments of I-94 were opened, starting with a  section from Hartford to Coloma, then another from Paw Paw to Kalamazoo which connected with a segment between Galesburg to Battle Creek. The overall  section from Paw Paw to Battle Creek was dedicated on December 7, 1959. In addition, a new northwest–southeast section of freeway was built east of Ypsilanti to create a more gradual curve in the routing between present-day exits 185 and 186, the original routing of the Willow Run Expressway having followed present-day Wiard Road. Signage for the state's Interstate Highways was placed on hold pending finalization of the numbering scheme, and by late 1959 that signage was being added starting with I-75 and followed by the other open segments of freeway in the state.

Sections of freeway opened in southwestern Michigan in 1960 between the Benton Harbor–St Joseph area and between Jackson and Ann Arbor; the latter was built over existing portions of US 12.

In January 1962, the US 12 designation was removed from the I-94 freeway. In the process, the designation was transferred to replace the US 112 designation in its entirety. After this transfer, I-94 was no longer concurrent with US 12, except for the Ypsilanti bypass. In 1963, the freeway was extended south of New Buffalo to end at M-239. Traffic was diverted down M-239 into Indiana where State Road 39 carried traffic the rest of the way to the Indiana Toll Road. By the end of the year, a section of highway opened between Mount Clemens and Marysville, and US 25 was rerouted to run concurrently along the freeway from the New Baltimore area northward.

The eastern terminus of I-94 in the Port Huron area was dedicated on October 14, 1964, signaling the completion of the highway between Marysville and the Blue Water Bridge. This completion displaced part of the M-146 bypass of Port Huron, the southern leg of which was retained as a connector to present-day Lapeer Road. Two years later, the gap between the Wayne–Macomb county line and the end of the freeway near Mount Clemens was filled in when another section of freeway opened. In late 1964, a plan was approved to improve the interchange with Telegraph Road (US 24), as the original interchange did not feature access in all directions. North of Albion, the route of the freeway previously crossed a branch of the New York Central Railroad at-grade; the crossing was eliminated when the tracks were removed in 1968.

The sections originally designated as the Willow Run Expressway were rebuilt from Rawsonville Road in Belleville to Ozga Road in Romulus starting in 1972. As part of this reconstruction, the segment between Haggerty and Ozga roads was widened from four to six lanes, and the eastbound lanes were realigned to facilitate construction of an interchange with I-275, a western bypass of Detroit which was under construction at the time. The Willow Run segment was also resurfaced at this point, as the old road bed did not contain steel mesh. Construction of this interchange also obliterated a partial interchange with Huron River Drive.

The final section of I-94 in Michigan opened to traffic on November 2, 1972, when the connection across the state line into Indiana was dedicated. This last segment in Michigan between M-239 and the state line opened when Indiana completed an  segment of freeway in their state.

Since completion
The interchange with the Southfield Freeway (M-39) was closed entirely in 1985 to replace the original exit design, which included four on-ramps that sharply merged into the left lanes of I-94. Reconstruction added new on-ramps that merge into the freeway's right lane, while also moving the carriageways of I-94 closer together.

On August 16, 1987, Northwest Airlines Flight 255 crashed after attempting to take off from Detroit Metropolitan Airport, killing all but one passenger upon exploding at the I-94 overpass over Middlebelt Road; that overpass was not damaged in the crash. The freeway was closed until August 18, and a memorial was later installed near the interchange between I-94 and Middlebelt Road.

The completion of I-69 in the 1980s, and the approval of the North American Free Trade Agreement, increased traffic at the Blue Water Bridge. A new toll and customs plaza was built in 1991, and, later the next year, an international task force determined that traffic on the existing structure was exceeding capacity. Environmental planning started in 1993, and construction started on the second span between Port Huron and Point Edward, Ontario in 1995. In July 1997, the second span opened. The original span was closed for rehabilitation, and both were opened to traffic in 1999.

The interchange with US 24 (Telegraph Road) following its mid-1960s redesign had only two bridges, and left-hand exits were used throughout. This interchange was reconfigured in 2005 to a SPUI design that was completed in December of that year. A pair of bridges called the Gateway Arch Bridges (alternately "Gateway to Detroit") was incorporated in the new interchange.

In 2011, construction was started to widen I-94/I-69 approaching the Blue Water Bridge and to allow for dedicated local traffic and bridge traffic lanes. The lane configuration changes confused drivers in the area, especially motorists with outdated GPS devices; because of this, MDOT installed updated signs complete with American and Canadian flags to help prevent drivers from heading to Canada by mistake.

Additional construction in the Port Huron area started in late 2013 to rebuild and reconfigure the I-94/I-69 interchange outside the city. The project improved  of freeway, replaced several bridges and ramps and cost $76 million (equivalent to $ in ). In June 2014, MDOT closed the ramps from I-69 eastbound to BL I-69 through the interchange until later in the year. The project was completed in September 2015.

In 2016, the sections of I-94 from the Indiana state line to the M-63 interchange was designated as part of the West Michigan Pike Pure Michigan Byway. The West Michigan Pike originated in efforts in the 1910s to improve a highway along the western part of the Lower Peninsula of Michigan and to increase tourism along the Lake Michigan shore. The auto trail was eventually superseded by US 12 and US 31 after the creation of the United States Numbered Highway System in 1926.

In 2020, work began on the final link of the St. Joseph Valley Parkway to connect the US 31 freeway to I-94 east of Benton Harbor. This new routing opened on November 9, 2022.

Memorial highway names

As the original expressway through the center of Detroit was being planned in the 1940s, it was unofficially named the Harper–McGraw Expressway after the streets along which it was to run. There was some initial support to name it after Roy D. Chapin, the late president of the Hudson Motor Car Company and a former US secretary of commerce under President Herbert Hoover. On April 23, 1946, the Detroit Common Council voted instead to name the highway after Edsel Ford, the son of Henry Ford and president of the Ford Motor Company from 1918 until his death in 1943.

Two other original sections of I-94's predecessor highways in the Detroit area were given early names. The westernmost of these is the Willow Run Expressway, named for the Willow Run complex. The plants at Willow Run produced B-24 Liberator bombers for Ford Motor Company during World War II. The second, the Detroit Industrial Expressway, continued the route of the Willow Run Expressway eastward into Detroit. Both highways were built to move workers from Detroit to the industrial plants at Willow Run during the war and were later incorporated into I-94 in the 1950s as part of a Detroit–Chicago highway.

The section of I-94 northeast of Detroit was named after former Congressman James G. O'Hara by the Michigan Legislature. O'Hara was a World War II veteran who served in the US House of Representatives from 1959 until 1977. During his tenure in Congress, he procured federal funds for the construction of I-94 through his district. The first attempt to name the highway after him failed in 1991, but the honor was included in a budget bill passed in 1997. The section of I-94 was dedicated on October 16, 1998, after donors privately raised nearly $10,000 (equivalent to $ in ) to pay for the highway signs.

A segment of I-94 in Battle Creek between the exits for BL I-94 and I-194 was named the 94th Combat Infantry Division Memorial Highway by the Michigan Legislature in 2002. The name honors the US Army's 94th Infantry Division, which was activated at nearby Fort Custer in 1942 and served with distinction in the European theater of World War II. Because the unit originated in Battle Creek, and its number matched that of the freeway, the Legislature added the designation by passing Public Act 305 of 2002. The name was dedicated in ceremonies at a rest stop along the section of I-94 on September 28, 2002.

Another piece of I-94 in Calhoun County was designated in 2004 as part of the Underground Railroad Memorial Highway. Starting in 1990, the National Park Service started working to identify routes of the Underground Railroad. The Battle Creek area was active in the railroad during the Civil War, and the section of I-94 between exits 98 and 110 east of Battle Creek was included in the memorial designation.

In June 2012, after a resolution passed by the Michigan Legislature was signed by Governor Rick Snyder, a portion of I-94 in Taylor between Inkster and Pelham roads was named the Auxiliary Lt. Dan Kromer Memorial Highway after a 20-year veteran of the Taylor Police Department, who was killed in 2010 while helping motorists who had car trouble.

Exit list

Related trunklines

There are nine highways related to I-94 in Michigan. The first is the spur into downtown Battle Creek numbered I-194 and nicknamed "The Penetrator" and officially called the "Sojourner Truth Downtown Parkway". The other eight highways are business loops of I-94 that connect various cities' downtowns with the main freeway. Unlike I-194, these loops are not freeways. Located from west to east along I-94's routing in Michigan, they serve Benton Harbor–St. Joseph, Kalamazoo, Battle Creek, Marshall, Albion, Jackson, Ann Arbor, and Port Huron.

See also

Notes

References

External links

I-94 at Michigan Highways
M-112 at Michigan Highways
Early Willow Run, Detroit Industrial & Edsel Ford Expressways at Michigan Highways

Michigan
94
Lake Michigan Circle Tour
Transportation in Berrien County, Michigan
Transportation in Van Buren County, Michigan
Transportation in Kalamazoo County, Michigan
Transportation in Calhoun County, Michigan
Transportation in Jackson County, Michigan
Transportation in Washtenaw County, Michigan
Transportation in Wayne County, Michigan
Transportation in Macomb County, Michigan
Transportation in St. Clair County, Michigan